Engineer is an honorific used in Afghanistan, which is commonly translated into English, rather than being transliterated, like "Mullah" or "Maulvi".

Examples of Afghan politicians known by the honorific Engineer
 Hamid Karzai's first cabinet included Engineer Abdul Rahim -- the Afghan Communications Minister.
 Hamid Karzai appointed Engineer Mohammad Daoud as the Governor of Helmand Province in December 2005.
 Engineer Mohammad Alim Qarar was selected to the Wolesi Jirga from Lagham Province.
 Engineer Abdul Hakim was one of the signatories to the Bonn Conference that picked Hamid Karzai as President of the Afghan Interim Administration.
 Engineer Muhammad Harif Sarwari entered the Meshrano Jirga in 2005.
 Engineer Muhammad Hashim Ortaq entered the Meshrano Jirga in 2005.

References

Politics of Afghanistan
Honorifics